The chess events at the 22nd Southeast Asian Games were held from 5 to 13 December 2003 at the Vân Đồn sports centre in District 4 of Ho Chi Minh City. This was the first time chess was contested for medals at the Southeast Asian Games. Medals were awarded in eight categories: men's and women's individual and team performances in the combined event held at  time controls, men's and women's individual competitions at  time controls, and men's and women's team competitions at rapid time controls.

Participating nations 

Of the nine countries that participated, six competed in all the events. Brunei did not contest the women's rapid events, Thailand only contested the men's events, and Laos sent one player to compete in the men's classical tournament.

Results summary

Individual rapid
Participating countries entered a maximum of two players into each rapid tournament.

In the semifinals of the men's tournament, Mark Paragua from the Philippines defeated Vietnam's Đào Thiên Hải 3–1, and Jason Goh Koon-Jong defeated Wu Shaobin (both from Singapore) 3–1. Paragua defeated Goh 1½–½ in the final to win the gold medal.

In the semifinals of the women's tournament, Vietnam's Lê Kiều Thiên Kim defeated Beverly Mendoza from the Philippines 1½–½, and Vietnam's Hoàng Thị Bảo Trâm defeated Malaysia's Siti Zulaikha Foudzi 1½–½. Paragua defeated Goh 3–2 in the final to win the gold medal.

Team rapid
On 7 December, eight men's teams and six women's teams competed separately in two rapid tournaments played on four . In both tournaments, the teams were divided into two groups and played a round-robin group stage. Two teams from each group qualified for the playoffs.

In the semifinals of the men's tournament, the Philippines defeated Singapore 3–1, and Vietnam defeated Malaysia 3½–½. In the final, the Philippines and Vietnam drew their first match 2–2 before the Philippines won a tiebreak match 3–1 to win the gold medal.

In the semifinals of the women's tournament, Indonesia defeated Singapore 2½–1½, and Vietnam defeated Myanmar 4–0. In the final, Vietnam and Indonesia drew their first match 2–2 and a tiebreak match 2–2 before Vietnam prevailed in a sudden-death playoff 2–1 to win the gold medal.

Individual and team classical
Medals were awarded to the best individual performances in each tournament, although it appears no country was allowed to win more than two individual classical medals. Also, the best four scores of players from each country were summed up to create a team score, and medals were awarded to the three highest team scores in each event.

In the men's tournament, Indonesia's Utut Adianto and Susanto Megaranto won the individual gold and silver medals respectively, and Eugenio Torre of the Philippines picked up the bronze medal. The Philippines won the team gold medal for the best aggregate score of its four highest-scoring players, while Indonesia took silver and Vietnam took bronze.

In the women's tournament, Vietnam's Nguyễn Thị Thanh An won the individual gold medal with a score of 8/9. Lê Kiều Thiên Kim and Lê Thị Phương Liên tied for second with 6½/9, and Lê Kiều Thiên Kim was awarded the silver medal on tiebreaks. Vietnam's Hoàng Thanh Trang and Malaysia's Siti Zulaikha Foudzi tied for fourth with 6/9, and Foudzi was awarded the bronze medal. Vietnam won the team gold medal for the best aggregate score of its four highest-scoring players, while Indonesia took silver and the Philippines took bronze.

Medal summary

Medal table

References

2003 Southeast Asian Games events
2003
Southeast Asian Games
2003 Southeast Asian Games